Dimo may refer to:
Dimo (name)
Dimo, South Sudan, a village
Dimo, an alternative name for Dimu, Syria, a village
Di mo, a membrane applied to the transverse Chinese flute
 Diesel & Motor Engineering, a Sri Lankan conglomerate commonly abbreviated as DIMO

See also
 DYMO Corporation